Type U 151 U-boats were a class of large, long-range submarines initially constructed during World War I to be merchant submarines and later used by the Kaiserliche Marine (Imperial German Navy).

Background

All were fitted with two bow torpedo tubes and could carry 18 torpedoes, with the exception of the former Deutschland, which was fitted with six tubes. All were armed with two  SK L/45 deck guns, and carried a crew of 56.

The success of the Type U 151 submarines led to "Project 46", the larger Type U 139 "U-cruisers", designed from the outset as military submarines.

Service
Deutschland made two successful commercial voyages before being commissioned into the Kaiserliche Marine on February 17, 1917 as U-155.

Max Valentiner commanded a Type U 151 U-boat, and undertook the longest cruise in the war from 27 November 1917 to 15 April 1918, a total of 139 days. High-scoring Waldemar Kophamel also commanded a Type U 151 U-boat,  in late summer and fall of 1917.

List of Type U 151 submarines 
Seven Type U 151 submarines were built, of which six were commissioned into the Kaiserliche Marine.

 
 
 
 , sunk by HMS E35
 , the former merchant submarine Deutschland
 , probably lost to a mine in September 1918

References

Bibliography

External links
 

Submarine classes
 
World War I submarines of Germany